Rafi and Mecartin are a  screenwriter and director duo best known for comedy films in Malayalam cinema. Raffi's younger brother Shafi is also a well-known film director. Raffi is also the nephew of director  Siddique from the Siddique–Lal duo. He has scripted and directed successful films such as Puthukkottayile Puthumanavalan (1995), Superman (1997), Punjabi House (1998), Thenkasipattanam (2000), Chathikkatha Chanthu (2004), Pandippada (2005), and Hallo (2007). The duo has also written the scripts for Aniyan Bava Chetan Bava (1995), Aadyathe Kanmani (1995), Dilliwala Rajakumaran (1996), Kusruthi Kuruppu (1998), One Man Show (2001), Thilakkam (2003), and Mayavi (2007) among others, for other directors.

Filmography

Director 

⊥ Rafi Alone

Screenwriter only 
 Ellarum Chollanu (1992) (writer)
 Mr & Mrs (1992) (writer)
 Aniyan Bava Chetan Bava (1995) (writer)
 Aadyathe Kanmani (1995) (screenplay and dialogue)
 Dilliwala Rajakumaran (1996) (writer)
 The Car (1997) (story)
 Kusruthi Kuruppu (1998) (Story, Screenplay,Dialogues)
 One Man Show (film) (2001) (writer)
 Thilakkam (2003) (writer)
 Romeoo (2007) (dialogue, screenplay, story)
 Mayavi (2007) (writer)
 Two Countries (2015) (Rafi alone)

Assistant director 
 Godfather (1991)
 Vietnam Colony (1993)
 Customs Diary (1993)

Acting credits of Rafi 
 Puthukkottayile Puthumanavalan (1995) (guest appearance)
 Ring Master (2014)
Villali Veeran (2015)
 Two Countries (2015)
 Shajahanum Pareekuttiyum (2016)
 Role Models (2017)
 Sherlock Toms (2017)
 Vikadakumaran(2018)
 Sakalakalasala (2018)
 Children's Park (2019)
 Ganagandharvan (2019)
 Shylock (2020) Director&Film Producer Chacko
 Naaradan

Mecartin as an Actor 

 Sathyam Sivam Sundaram (2000)

References

External links 
 
 

Malayalam film directors
Malayalam screenwriters
Indian filmmaking duos
Living people
Indian male screenwriters
Indian screenwriting duos
Film directors from Kochi
20th-century Indian film directors
21st-century Indian film directors
Screenwriters from Kochi
Year of birth missing (living people)